The 1977 Oklahoma State Cowboys football team represented Oklahoma State University in the 1977 NCAA Division I football season. This was the 77th year of football at OSU and the fifth under Jim Stanley. The Cowboys played their home games at Lewis Field in Stillwater, Oklahoma. They finished the season 4–7, and 2–5 in the Big Eight Conference.

Schedule

Roster

After the season

The 1978 NFL Draft took place on May 2–3, 1978 at the Roosevelt Hotel in New York City. The following Oklahoma State players were selected during the draft.

References

Oklahoma State
Oklahoma State Cowboys football seasons
Oklahoma State Cowboys football